Gianbernardino Scotti (died 1568) was an Italian Roman 
Catholic bishop and cardinal.

Biography
Gianbernardino Scotti was born in Magliano Sabina ca. 1478, the son of a noble family that had lived there for 400 years. 

He was an expert in Greek, Hebrew, Chaldean, and in canon law. He entered the order of the Theatines in 1525, and is believed to be the first man to receive the Theatine habit. He was subsequently ordained as a priest.

In 1548, he accompanied Luigi Lippomano, Bishop of Verona during the bishop's nunciature in Germany. Returning from Germany, he moved to Venice to continue his studies.

In 1555, Pope Paul IV, one of the founders of the Theatine Order, summoned Scotti to Rome, making him Archbishop of Trani and cardinal priest in the consistory of 20 December 1555. He received the red hat and the titular church of San Matteo in Via Merulana on 13 January 1556.

He participated in the papal conclave of 1559 that elected Pope Pius IV. On 9 August 1559 he was transferred to the see of Piacenza. Pope Pius IV called him to Rome and named him to a commission of cardinals charged with reforming the Roman Missal and the Roman Breviary.

He was a participant in the papal conclave of 1565-66 that elected Pope Pius V. The new pope made him a member of the Roman Inquisition, and placed him in charge of the affairs of the Eastern Catholic Churches. He resigned the government of Piacenza sometime before 23 July 1568.

He died in Rome on 11 December 1568. He was buried in the Basilica of Saint Paul Outside the Walls.

References

1568 deaths
Theatines
16th-century Italian cardinals
Year of birth unknown